Frederick Benjamin Kaye (April 20, 1892 – 1930) was an American scholar who was notable for his work on Bernard Mandeville.

Early life and education 
Kaye was born in New York City as Frederick Benjamin Kugelman to Julius G. Kugelman, a native of Hamburg, Germany, who had emigrated to New York. Frederick Kugelman subsequently changed his surname to Kaye. He was educated at Yale University, where he obtained a Bachelor of Arts in 1914 and a Master of Arts in 1916.

Career 
Kaye was professor of English at Northwestern University from 1918 to 1930. During his career, Kaye became known for his scholarship on the topic of Bernard Mandeville. In 1975, Mandeville Studies claimed that Kaye "almost single-handedly revived Mandeville as one of the most important writers of the eighteenth century".

Works
'The Writings of Bernard Mandeville: A Bibliographical Survey', The Journal of English and Germanic Philology, Vol. 20, No. 4 (Oct., 1921), pp. 419–467.
'The Influence of Bernard Mandeville', Studies in Philology, Vol. 19, No. 1 (Jan., 1922), pp. 83–108. 
'Mandeville on the Origin of Language', Modern Language Notes, Vol. 39, No. 3 (Mar., 1924), pp. 136–142. 
(with R. S. Crane), 'A Census of British Newspapers and Periodicals, 1620-1800', Studies in Philology, Vol. 24, No. 1 (Jan., 1927), pp. 1–205.

Notes

1892 births
1930 deaths
Northwestern University faculty
People from New York City
Yale University alumni